Marko Farion (born 03/28/1962 in Cleveland, Ohio) is a Ukrainian American bandurist, opera singer and dentist. Farion currently resides in Sterling Heights, Michigan with dental offices in Clawson, Michigan and Artesia, New Mexico. His music has been featured on PBS. He has been referenced in several books about bandura and bandurists.

Early life and education 

Farion studied bandura and voice under Hryhory Kytasty (1907-1984), the legendary bandurist, composer and Musical Director and Conductor of the Ukrainian Bandurist Chorus.  
Farion attended Case Western Reserve University where he completed a BA in Chemistry with a minor in Music with voice being his principal instrument. His vocal teacher was Gretchen Garnett.  He also studied voice at the Cleveland Institute of Music with Reuben Caplin and the Cleveland Music Settlement with Robert Page. Later Farion attended the Case Western Reserve University School of Dentistry and achieved his Doctorate of Dental Surgery. He is a dentist practicing in Michigan and New Mexico.

Career 

Farion became a member of the Ukrainian Bandurist Chorus at age 15 and became a bass soloist at 17. He has also been featured as a bass soloist with the University Circle Chorale, Detroit Concert Choir, Detroit Symphony Orchestra Chorus,  the Livonia Symphony. and the Dnipro Chorus in their 1988 World Premier performance of Kouzan's "Neophytes" in Edmonton.
He has also been a soloist at several Society of Ukrainian Bandurist events, including a tour of South America. He has been a featured soloist and cantor in many church choirs. He was a member of Volodymyr Kolesnyk's Millenium Choir which released the 35 Sacred Choral Concertos of Dmytro Bortnyansky. He has also performed with the Detroit Opera House Michigan Opera Theatre Chorus and the Canadian Ukrainian Opera Chorus. 
He has toured North and South America and Europe.  He has performed as a soloist at Carnegie Hall, Roy Thomson Hall, Teatro Coliseo and the Lviv Opera House.
Farion was a founding member of the Society of Ukrainian Bandurists, and held the position of President. He was also a founding member of the Hryhory Kytasty School of Bandura and its first Musical Director in 1984. Farion had been a member of the Arts Council for 20 years with the Ukrainian Bandurist Chorus, 6 years as VP of the Board, and 2 years as President of the Board of the Ukrainian Bandurist Chorus.
Farion was one of the founders of the Kobzarska Sich summer music program and camp and was its administrator for 11 years. He also led the CYM Detroit Bandura School and is on staff with the Detroit School of Bandura. He is a regular member of the teaching staff at the annual “Bandura at Bobriwka” summer music program in the Berkshires of Connecticut. He has written compositions for the bandura and numerous arrangements for instrumental as well as vocal and instrumental songs. 
He has participated in courses and workshops in the United States, Canada and Germany. He has been a visiting lecturer at the University of Michigan Eastern European Studies Department

Recordings 

Marko Farion has taken part in 10 recordings of the Ukrainian Bandurist Chorus being featured as a soloist on 3 of them.  
He has taken part in 12 recordings of the Detroit Concert Choir being featured as a soloist on 7 of them. He was involved in the recording of Dmytro Bortnyansky's 35 Sacred Choral Concertos by the Millenium Chorus in Guelph, Ontario.  He was bass soloist for 's Millenium Liturgy recorded in Edmonton, Alberta.  Farion was involved in the Michigan Opera Theatre World Premiere recording of David DiChiera's Cyrano.  Farion has a solo release called "Bandura LIVE!" of his bandura solo work. Farion also has multiple digital singles released thru cdbaby and available on all platf. The most recent full length release is "Quarantune Kobzar" which is a compilation of the online performances recorded during the 2020 shutdown due to the COVID-19 pandemic.

'''TV & Film

In 2017 Farion's bandura is heard throughout the Milwaukee PBS "The Arts Page" feature "Pysanka - Ukrainian Easter Egg".   
His music is also featured in the 2018 award winning documentary "Baba Babee Skazala" (dir. by Matej Silecky) about the Ukrainian refuge children of post World War 2 Europe.
He has an uncredited appearance as a member of the Michigan Opera Theatre Chorus in the Detroit PBS feature "Curtain Call to Cyrano" in 2007, a documentary short about the preparation for the World Premiere of the David DiChiera opera "Cyrano".

References 

1962 births
Living people
Bandurists
Ukrainian conductors (music)
Male conductors (music)
Recipients of the title of Hero of Ukraine
20th-century Ukrainian male opera singers
Case Western Reserve University alumni
Cleveland Institute of Music alumni
21st-century conductors (music)
21st-century American male singers
21st-century American singers